The 2017 ICC World Cricket League Division Five was an international cricket tournament that took place in Benoni, South Africa during September 2017. It formed part of the 2017–19 cycle of the World Cricket League (WCL) which determines the qualification for the 2023 Cricket World Cup. Jersey and the Netherlands were interested in hosting the tournament, but the International Cricket Council (ICC) awarded it to South Africa, due to the ease of securing visas for the teams involved.

The teams were placed into two groups of four sides. Guernsey, Cayman Islands, Italy and Qatar are in Group A, and Germany, Ghana, Jersey and Vanuatu are in Group B. The top two teams in each group progressed to the semi-finals, while the other two teams competed for placings. The top two teams qualified for the World Cricket League Division Four tournament, scheduled to take place in the middle of 2018, and five teams were relegated to regional divisions.

Both Jersey and Vanuatu won their semi-final matches, therefore progressing to the tournament final, with both teams being promoted to Division Four. In the final, Jersey beat Vanuatu by 120 runs to win the tournament. Qatar won the third-place playoff by 3 wickets to remain in Division Five, with all the other teams being relegated.

Teams
Eight teams qualified for the tournament. Three teams qualified from previous WCL tournaments:
  (5th in 2016 ICC World Cricket League Division Four)
  (6th in 2016 ICC World Cricket League Division Four)
  (3rd in 2016 ICC World Cricket League Division Five)

The remaining five teams qualified through regional competitions:
  (East Asia Pacific)
  (Americas)
  (Africa)
  (Asia)
  (Europe)

Squads

Fixtures

Group A

Group B

Semi-finals

Playoffs

Seventh-place playoff

Fifth-place playoff

Third-place playoff

Final

Final standings

Notes

References

External links
 Series home at ESPN Cricinfo

2017–19 ICC World Cricket League
2017 in South African cricket
International cricket competitions in 2017
International cricket competitions in South Africa